Trechus dzermukensis is a species of ground beetle in the subfamily Trechinae. It was described by Iablokoff-Khnzorian in 1963.

References

dzermukensis
Beetles described in 1963